The Special Operations Force (SOF) is the primary special forces unit of the Singapore Army responsible for conducting special operations. It is composed of only highly-trained regular servicemen from the Commandos formation. It is also a component of the Special Operations Task Force (SOTF), alongside the Special Warfare Group (SWG) of the Republic of Singapore Navy (RSN).

History
On 27 September 1972, a flight engineer aboard Olympic Airlines Flight 472 accidentally activated a hijack alarm. The flight, which had 31 passengers and 11 crew members on board, took off from Sydney, Australia at 1030 hours SST and was heading towards Paya Lebar Airport in Singapore. The Australian authorities were not informed of the situation until four hours later. Following a flurry of conflicting reports, Australia's Civil Aviation Safety Authority warned Paya Lebar Airport to be prepared for a possible hijack.

Flight 472 landed in Singapore at 1825 hours SST and was immediately surrounded by the police before the Singapore authorities could confirm that it was a false alarm. The incident highlighted the lack of special forces trained and equipped to deal with a hijack or hostage situation in Singapore. This led to the creation of the SOF in 1985 as a unit specially tasked with dealing with such situations.

Operation Thunderbolt (1991)

On 26 March 1991, Singapore Airlines Flight 117 was hijacked in flight by four men, who took all 129 people on board hostage. At Singapore Changi Airport, commandos from the SOF stormed the plane, killed the four hijackers and freed the hostages in under a minute. This also marked the SOF's first combat operation.

Other operations

It was reported that some SOF commandos have been deployed to Afghanistan under Operation Blue Ridge alongside regular Commmandos.

References

Bibliography
 

1984 establishments in Singapore
Formations of the Singapore Army
Special forces of Singapore
Counterterrorism in Singapore
Military counterterrorist organizations